Love & Peace (also released as Reunited) is a 1982 album by the Elvin Jones-McCoy Tyner Quintet released on the Japanese Trio label. It was recorded in April 1982 and features performances by Jones and Tyner with Pharoah Sanders, Jean-Paul Bourelly and Richard Davis.

Reception
According to the Allmusic review by Scott Yanow, the album is "an interesting but not overly memorable outing".

Track listing
 "Little Rock's Blues" (Sanders) - 4:35
 "Hip Jones" (Sanders)  7:27
 "Korina" (Perla) - 5:35
 "For Tomorrow" (Tyner) - 7:08
 "Sweet and Lovely" (Arnheim, LeMare, Tobias) - 6:52
 "Origin" (Sanders) - 5:05
Recorded at Van Gelder Studio, Englewood Cliffs, NJ, April 13 & 14, 1982

Personnel
Elvin Jones: drums
McCoy Tyner: piano
Pharoah Sanders: tenor saxophone
Jean-Paul Bourelly: guitar
Richard Davis: bass

References

Elvin Jones albums
McCoy Tyner albums
1982 albums
Albums recorded at Van Gelder Studio